Marcílio Alves da Silva (born 11 May 1976), or simply Marcílio, is a former footballer who played as a defender. Born in Brazil, Marcílio is of Lebanese descent; he represented Lebanon internationally at the 2000 AFC Asian Cup.

International career 
Marcílio formerly represented the Lebanon national football team at the 2000 AFC Asian Cup.

Career statistics

International

Honours
Individual
 Lebanese Premier League Team of the Season: 2000–01

See also
 List of Lebanon international footballers born outside Lebanon

References

External links
 
 
 Marcílio at CBF Database 

1976 births
Living people
Footballers from Rio de Janeiro (city)
Brazilian people of Lebanese descent
Brazilian emigrants to Lebanon
Sportspeople of Lebanese descent
Citizens of Lebanon through descent
Lebanese footballers
Brazilian footballers
Association football defenders
Lebanon international footballers
Bangu Atlético Clube players
Lebanese Premier League players
Akhaa Ahli Aley FC players
Olympic Beirut players
Sagesse SC footballers
Madureira Esporte Clube players
Bonsucesso Futebol Clube players
2000 AFC Asian Cup players